The W. S. George Pottery Company was a United States pottery manufacturer with facilities in Ohio and Pennsylvania between 1904 and 1960.

History

William Shaw George purchased the controlling interest in the East Palestine Pottery Company from the Sebring brothers in 1904, renaming the company The W. S. George Pottery Company.  In 1910 the company opened a manufacturing facility in Canonsburg, Pennsylvania ("Plant #2"), and in 1914 another facility was opened in Kittanning, Pennsylvania ("Plant #3").  In 1912 fire destroyed most of the East Palestine, Ohio, facility, named "Plant #1".  At the time, "Plant #1" employed 750 East Palestine residents, which accounted for nearly one third of the city's population.  The facility was rebuilt in 1924 and was called "Plant #4".  In 1955 the company went bankrupt, and the East Palestine facility was reorganized and came under the control and administration of the Royal China Company, who renamed the facility "Royal China Incorporated, East Palestine Division".  The company operated for nearly 56 years, liquidating its holdings between 1959-1960, and closing in 1960.

Products
The W. S. George Pottery Company produced semi-porcelain dinnerware, hotel ware, and toilet wares.  At its peak the company was able to produce over 800,000 dozen-piece sets of dinnerware.

References

Ceramics manufacturers of the United States
Columbiana County, Ohio
Defunct manufacturing companies based in Ohio
American companies established in 1904
1960 disestablishments in Ohio
Manufacturing companies established in 1904
Manufacturing companies disestablished in 1960